The 50-Miler Award is an award of the Boy Scouts of America (BSA) designed to promote the ideals of Scouting and in Scoutcraft, conservation, self-reliance, and physical fitness.  The award may be earned by Boy Scouts, Varsity Scouts, Venturers, and leaders.

Award
The 50-Miler Award is presented as a cloth or leather patch and as a decal.  The award may not be worn on the uniform but is affixed to equipment such as backpacks or vehicles, or sewn onto items such as patch vests or blankets. The 50-Miler Award was established in April 1956, along with the Historic Trails Award.

Requirements

Although the 50-Miler is an individual award, the requirements are performed as a group. Groups may be the troop, team, crew, or an ad hoc group made of members of various units. The trip must be properly planned and may include other opportunities for advancement and recognition. Travel may be by foot, bicycle, canoe, or boat; pack animals may be used where appropriate. No travel may involve any motorized vehicle. The group must also complete ten hours of conservation work. If ten hours of work cannot be completed on the trail, similar work may be done in the group's home area. Even if the award's requirements are completed at a National Jamboree or High Adventure base, the unit's leader must file an application at their local council's service center.

References

External links
 

Advancement and recognition in the Boy Scouts of America